Pic de Néouvielle (3,091 m) is a mountain in the Néouvielle massif in the French Pyrenees.

It is located in the commune of Saint-Lary-Soulan within the department of the Hautes-Pyrénées, and lies on the border between the Pyrenees National Park and the Néouvielle National Nature Reserve. The name Pic de Néouvielle derives from nèu vielha, meaning 'old snow' in the Occitan language; the inhabitants of the vallée d'Aure call the peak la montagne d'Aubert.

The mountain has four corries, some containing small glaciers, separated by sharp granite ridges. Its south face is between 400 and 500 m high, and dominates the deep valley of the lac de Cap-de-Long. The shapely Pic Ramougn lies on its east ridge.

The first known ascent of Pic de Néouvielle was made on 10 July 1847 by Vincent de Chausenque and the Barèges guide Bastien Teinturier.

External links
 Pic de Néouvielle on SummitPost

Mountains of Hautes-Pyrénées
Mountains of the Pyrenees
Pyrenean three-thousanders